Eastern District is one of the three constituencies represented in the General Junta of the Principality of Asturias, the regional legislature of the Principality of Asturias. The constituency currently elects five deputies. It comprises the municipalities of Amieva, Cabrales, Cabranes, Cangas de Onís, Caravia, Colunga, Llanes, Nava, Onís, Parres, Peñamellera Alta, Peñamellera Baja, Piloña, Ponga, Ribadedeva, Ribadesella and Villaviciosa. The electoral system uses the D'Hondt method and a closed-list proportional representation, with a minimum threshold of three percent.

Electoral system
The constituency was created as per the Statute of Autonomy for Asturias of 1981 and was first contested in the 1983 regional election. The Statute provided for sub-provincial divisions of the Principality's territory to be established as multi-member districts in the General Junta of the Principality of Asturias, with this regulation being maintained under the 1986 regional electoral law. Each constituency is entitled to an initial minimum of two seats, with the remaining 39 being distributed in proportion to their populations. The exception was the 1983 election, when each constituency was allocated a fixed number of seats: 32 for the Central District, 5 for the Eastern District and 8 for the Western District.

Voting is on the basis of universal suffrage, which comprises all nationals over eighteen, registered in Asturias and in full enjoyment of their political rights. Amendments to the electoral law in 2011 required for Asturians abroad to apply for voting before being permitted to vote, a system known as "begged" or expat vote. Seats are elected using the D'Hondt method and a closed list proportional representation, with a threshold of three percent of valid votes—which includes blank ballots—being applied in each constituency. The only exception was in 1983, when a five percent threshold was applied regionally. Parties not reaching the threshold are not taken into consideration for seat distribution. The use of the D'Hondt method might result in a higher effective threshold, depending on the district magnitude.

The electoral law allows for parties and federations registered in the interior ministry, coalitions and groupings of electors to present lists of candidates. Parties and federations intending to form a coalition ahead of an election are required to inform the relevant Electoral Commission within ten days of the election call—fifteen before 1985—whereas groupings of electors need to secure the signature of at least one percent of the electorate in the constituencies for which they seek election—one-thousandth of the electorate, with a compulsory minimum of 500 signatures, until 1985—disallowing electors from signing for more than one list of candidates.

Deputies

Elections

2019 regional election

2015 regional election

2012 regional election

2011 regional election

2007 regional election

2003 regional election

1999 regional election

1995 regional election

1991 regional election

1987 regional election

1983 regional election

References

General Junta of the Principality of Asturias constituencies
Asturias
Constituencies established in 1983
1983 establishments in Spain